Otacílio is a Portuguese given name (sometimes surname), may refer to:
Otacílio Mariano Neto (born 1982), Brazilian footballer
Otacílio Gonçalves da Silva Junior, Brazilian football manager
Otacílio Jales da Silva (born 1984), Brazilian footballer
Cilinho, real name Otacílio Pires de Camargo, Brazilian football manager

Portuguese masculine given names